Gerardo Sánchez García (born 1 October 1960) is a Mexican politician affiliated with the PRI. He currently serves as Senator of the LXII Legislature of the Mexican Congress. He also served as Deputy during the LXI Legislature, as well as the municipal president of Salvatierra, Guanajuato.

References

1960 births
Living people
Politicians from Guanajuato
Members of the Senate of the Republic (Mexico)
Members of the Chamber of Deputies (Mexico)
Institutional Revolutionary Party politicians
People from Salvatierra, Guanajuato
21st-century Mexican politicians
Universidad Michoacana de San Nicolás de Hidalgo alumni
National Autonomous University of Mexico alumni
20th-century Mexican politicians
Municipal presidents in Guanajuato